Comorians in France consist of migrants from Comoros and their descendants living and working in France.                                    

Outside of Mayotte, where Comorians are an important proportion of the local population, a great Comorian community is settled in Metropolitan France, mostly in Marseille.

Significance                           
Comorian immigrants make up a significant part of Mayotte's population. In 2011, the number of migrants was estimated at around 40 to 50 thousand people out of a total population of 250,000, and in 2018 this number had risen to at least 130,000 (45% of the island's population). This rate of immigration, caused by the close geographical proximity of the two nations and an unstable economy, poses sociopolitical issues for the territory.

The Comorian diaspora in mainland France is equally significant, most notably in Marseille, which has been described by the ex-president of the Comoros Ahmed Abdallah Mohamed Sambi as "...the fifth island of the Comoros". Other areas with high Comorian populations are Paris.

Bibliography                           

 Abdou Katibo, 'Les migrations comoriennes en France', Recherches internationales, no 90, pg. 135-152 (read online)
 Sophie Blanchy, 'Les Comoriens, une immigration méconnue', Hommes & Migrations, no 1215, 1998, pg. 5-20 (read online)

See also                               

 Murder of Ibrahim Ali

References 

African diaspora in France
Society of France
 
Ethnic groups in France
Immigration to France by country of origin